Amber-Paris Hall (born 7 January 1995) is a New Zealand rugby league footballer who plays for the Brisbane Broncos in the NRL Women's Premiership. 

Playing career
In 2012, Hall, a Richmond Roses player, was named in New Zealand's 2012 training squad, although no games were played that season. In 2013, she made her debut for New Zealand at the 2013 Women's Rugby League World Cup, playing two games.

On 10 August 2018, Hall represented Auckland in a trial game against the New Zealand Warriors NRL Women's Premiership team.

2019
On 11 June, she signed with the Brisbane Broncos NRLW team.

In Round 1 of the 2019 NRL Women's season, Hall made her debut for the Broncos, scoring a try in a 14–4 win over the St George Illawarra Dragons.

2020
In Round 2 of the 2020 NRL Women's season, she was charged with Grade 1 dangerous contact on Dragons'  Isabelle Kelly and was suspended for one game. She was named Player of the Match, winning the Karyn Murphy Medal.

On 27 November, at the Broncos' end of season awards, Hall won the Player of the Year, Players' Player and Best Forward awards.

2022
In late September, Hall was named in the Dream Team announced by the Rugby League Players Association. The team was selected by the players, who each cast one vote for each position. In October she was selected for the New Zealand squad at the delayed 2021 Women's Rugby League World Cup in England.

Achievements and accolades

Individual
Karyn Murphy Medal: 2020
Brisbane Broncos Player of the Year: 2020
Brisbane Broncos Players' Player: 2020
Brisbane Broncos Best Forward: 2020

Team
2019 NRLW Grand Final: Brisbane Broncos – Winners
2020 NRLW Grand Final: Brisbane Broncos – Winners

References

External links
Brisbane Broncos profile

1995 births
Living people
New Zealand female rugby league players
New Zealand women's national rugby league team players
Rugby league props
Rugby league second-rows
Brisbane Broncos (NRLW) players